Watts–Hillandale Historic District, also known as Club Acres and Englewood, is a national historic district located at Durham, Durham County, North Carolina. The district encompasses 446 contributing buildings, 2 contributing sites, and 2 contributing structures in a predominantly residential section of Durham. They were built after 1909 and include notable examples of Mission Revival and Colonial Revival style architecture.  Located in the district is the separately listed Watts Hospital complex.

It was listed on the National Register of Historic Places in 2001.

The neighborhood is home to active community members and leaders. Halloween, particularly on Club Boulevard, is full of trick-or-treaters from across the city, with homes on the street giving out treats to 1,000 or more children who visit for the festivities.

References

Historic districts on the National Register of Historic Places in North Carolina
Mission Revival architecture in North Carolina
Colonial Revival architecture in North Carolina
Historic districts in Durham, North Carolina
National Register of Historic Places in Durham County, North Carolina
Neighborhoods in Durham, North Carolina